EHC Basel known as Eishockey Club Basel are a professional Swiss ice hockey team. They are based out of the St. Jakob Arena in Basel, Switzerland. EHC Basel was founded on October 14, 1932. Were promoted to the Nationalliga A for 2005–06 after winning the Nationalliga B the previous season. They made the playoffs and were drawn against defending champions HC Davos in the first round, losing the series 4-1. Basel finished in last place in 2006–07, but managed to avoid relegation by beating SCL Tigers in the playouts. EHC Basel has won five championships of the Nationalliga B in 1935, 1941, 1956, 2003, and 2005. Again in 2007-08 they finished bottom and were relegated to National League B (after losing in the playouts).

The club has hosted a preseason tournament called Basel Summer Ice Hockey since 2009.

The club filled a bankruptcy case on July 7, 2014.

Notable players
Hnat Domenichelli
David Legwand
Mike Maneluk
Rob Zamuner
Fabienne Peter, Switzerland's first transgender hockey player

External links

EHC Basel official website
EHC Basel Fan Forum
EHC Basel Fanpage

Ice hockey clubs established in 1932
Ice hockey teams in Switzerland
Sport in Basel